James Benson may refer to:
James Rea Benson (1807–1885), Canadian businessman and politician
James Benson (Medal of Honor) (1845–1890), United States Navy sailor
James Benson (Jim Benson, c. 1945–2008), American spaceflight developer
James William Benson (1826–1878), English scientific instrument maker and watchmaker